The false trevally (Lactarius lactarius) is a species of fish in the family Lactariidae, currently the sole member of the family.

Distribution
The false trevally is native to the Indian Ocean and from East Africa to Southeast Asia, and in the western Pacific Ocean from Japan to Queensland, Australia. It is an important species to local commercial fisheries.

Description
This fish is colored silvery-grey on the upper parts with blue iridescence dorsally and a dusky black spot on the upper gill cover. The underparts are colored silvery-white. The fins are pale yellow.

Gallery

References

Percoidea
Extant Eocene first appearances
Fish described in 1801
Monotypic fish genera